Longsight TMD may refer to:

Longsight Diesel TMD
Longsight Electric TMD
Manchester International Depot, also known as Longsight International TMD